Shirin Nesa (also Romanized as Shīrīn Nesā; also known as  Shīrnesā, Shir Nesā, and Shīrnesā’) is a village in Layl Rural District, in the Central District of Lahijan County, Gilan Province, Iran. At the 2016 census, its population was 177, in 68 families.

References 

Populated places in Lahijan County